The Siberian Times is an English-language news website that was originally launched in Novosibirsk, Russia, in 2012. According to the editor of the website, Svetlana Skarbo, their aim is to challenge stereotypes about the region, which have been described as "negative and out of date". Former employees at East2West Limited have made accounts saying the idea for the site was formulated by Will Stewart, a British journalist who often cites it as a source in his articles.

Stories from the news site are increasingly garnering the attention of the Western media. One such is an article about frozen Siberian worms becoming reanimated after thawing out of the permafrost. The story was also reported by the Smithsonian website, although a separate claim was made by the academic journal Doklady Biological Sciences.

Its literary style as a news source is still unknown. According to Mashable, its stories are "allegedly real with a bit of hyperbole/Siberian fan fiction thrown in". Doubtfulnews.com also referred to the website as "not a reliable source for news".

Other Siberian Times stories have been picked up by Radio Free Europe/Radio Liberty, The Daily Telegraph, The Independent and Business Insider.

References 

2012 establishments in Russia
English-language websites
Internet properties established in 2012
Mass media in Novosibirsk
Russian news websites